Pinpollitol is a cyclitol. It is a di-O-methyl-(+)-chiro-inositol that can be isolated from Pinus radiata.

References

Cyclitols